Rensselaerville Historic District is a national historic district located at Rensselaerville in Albany County, New York. It includes 86 contributing buildings and encompasses most of the buildings in the hamlet of Rensselaerville.  Most date to the early 19th century and are predominantly Greek Revival in style.

It was listed on the National Register of Historic Places in 1983.

References

Historic districts on the National Register of Historic Places in New York (state)
Historic districts in Albany County, New York
National Register of Historic Places in Albany County, New York